The 2022 Southland Conference men's basketball tournament was the postseason men's basketball tournament for the 2021–22 season in the Southland Conference. The tournament was held March 9–12, 2022, at the Merrell Center in Katy, Texas. The tournament winner, the Texas A&M–Corpus Christi Islanders, received the conference's automatic invitation to the 2022 NCAA Division I men's basketball tournament.

Seeds 
Teams will be seeded by record within the conference, with a tie–breaker system to seed teams with identical conference records. All eight teams in the conference qualify for the tournament. The top two seeds received double byes into the semifinals in the merit-based format. The No. 3 and No. 4 seeds received single byes to the quarterfinals. Tiebreakers used are 1) Head-to-head results, 2) comparison of records against individual teams in the conference starting with the top-ranked team(s) and working down and 3) NCAA NET rankings available on day following the conclusion of regular-season play.

Schedule

Bracket

* denotes number of overtime periods

References 

Tournament
Southland Conference men's basketball tournament
Southland Conference men's basketball tournament
Southland Conference men's basketball tournament
Sports competitions in Katy, Texas
Basketball competitions in Texas
College basketball tournaments in Texas